"It's Not About You" is the fourth single by Scouting for Girls from their debut album.

The song was originally released in June 2007 as a limited release EP, and charted at #31 on the UK Singles Chart. In July 2008, the song started to appear on future release lists, and was re-released at the beginning of August. It managed to reach #67 on downloads alone, and reached #38, after the physical release was available.

Music video 
This music video is set in a restaurant, where Roy asks a number of girls to a restaurant. They all seem uninterested with him, and he pulls out the same flowers for them all. They all leave him, and near the end, Roy is sitting alone at his table when the young waitress sits down with him. They both laugh as the scene fades to black.

Charts

Track listings
It's Not About You E.P.

7" vinyl (Clear Green)
 "It's Not About You"
 "Keep on Walking"

CD (promotional and public release)
 "It's Not About You"
 "Keep on Walking"
 "Mountains of Navaho"

References

External links
 Official website 
 Official YouTube channel

2007 singles
2007 debut EPs
Scouting for Girls songs
2007 songs
Epic Records singles
Songs written by Roy Stride